Pali Aru is a river in Northern Province, Sri Lanka. The river rises in northern Vavuniya District, near Puliyankulam, before flowing north/northwest through Vavuniya District, Mullaitivu District and Mannar District. The river empties into Palk Bay. The southern section of the river is sometimes known as Chamalankulam Aru.

See also 
 List of rivers of Sri Lanka

References 

Rivers of Sri Lanka
Bodies of water of Mannar District
Bodies of water of Mullaitivu District
Bodies of water of Vavuniya District